Cocoanut (French: Noix de coco) is a 1939 French-German comedy drama film adapted by Marcel Achard from his play of the same name. It was directed by Jean Boyer and stars Raimu, Marie Bell and Michel Simon. The film was made by the German studio UFA, and released by its French subsidiary ACE.

The film's art direction was by Max Mellin.

Cast
 Raimu as Loulou Barbentane  
 Marie Bell as Caroline  
 Michel Simon as Josserand  
 Gilbert Gil as Antoine  
 Junie Astor as Colette Ventadour  
 Gisèle Préville as Nathalie  
 Fernand Fabre as Salvador  
 Betty Daussmond as Angèle  
 Georges Lannes as Lieberkrantz  
 Marcel Maupi as Colleville 
 Magdeleine Bérubet as Mme Testavin  
 Harry-James as Un invité 
 Suzet Maïs as Fernande Josserand 
 Simone Gauthier
 Claire Gérard as Une invitée

References

Bibliography 
 Crisp, Colin. Genre, Myth and Convention in the French Cinema, 1929-1939. Indiana University Press, 2002.

External links 
 

1939 films
German comedy-drama films
1939 comedy-drama films
1930s French-language films
Films directed by Jean Boyer
French films based on plays
UFA GmbH films
French comedy-drama films
French black-and-white films
German black-and-white films
1930s French films
1930s German films